Carlos do Amaral may refer to:

 Carlos do Amaral Freire, Brazilian scholar, linguist and translator
 Carlos Rafael do Amaral (born 1983), Brazilian football midfielder